A thirteenth is a note and an interval in music theory.

Thirteenth or 13th may also refer to:

 13th (film), a 2016 documentary on the Thirteenth Amendment to the United States Constitution
 "The 13th", a song from Wild Mood Swings by The Cure
 "The Thirteenth" (Orange Is the New Black), a 2019 television episode